Time of Our Lives is a television programme hosted by Jeff Stelling on Sky Sports. The format is a gathering of three players from a successful British football team from history talking over their memories of the team. Further programmes were presented by Gary Newbon when sportsmen and women were gathered from a collection of other great teams and sporting events.

Episodes

References

2009 British television series debuts
2010 British television series endings
British sports television series
Football mass media in the United Kingdom
Sky UK original programming
English-language television shows